Leon Barszczewski (February 20, 1849 in Warsaw – March 19, 1910 in Częstochowa) was a Polish soldier, topographer, explorer of the Central Asia culture, naturalist, and glaciologer.

At the Paris exposition of 1895, he won a gold medal for his photographs of minerals.

References 

1849 births
1910 deaths